Józef Franciszek Korbas (11 November 1914 – 2 October 1981) was a Polish footballer who played as a forward. He played for Cracovia and the Poland national team during the interwar period.

Club career 
In Cracovia, Korbas played from 1935 to 1939. In 69 games during that time, he scored 54 goals.

International career 
Korbas is famous for his excellent national team debut. On 12 September 1937 in Sofia, versus Bulgaria, he scored 3 goals and the match ended in 3–3 draw. In the history of the Polish national team, only two players managed to score a hat-trick in their first game, the other being Zygmunt Steuermann. Korbas's second and last match in white-red jersey took place in Warsaw, on 25 September 1938 (Poland - Jugoslavia 4-4). In this game, he also scored a goal.

After football 
During Nazi occupation of Poland, in 1942 was arrested by the Germans and in March 1943 sent to Auschwitz concentration camp. From there, was shuttled to Sachsenhausen concentration camp. Having survived this, after the war returned to Poland, Korbas became a sport official as well as a coach. He was also a trainer such as Stilon Gorzów in 1954.

Korbas died on 2 October 1981 in Katowice.

References

1914 births
1981 deaths
Polish footballers
Poland international footballers
MKS Cracovia (football) players
GKP Gorzów Wielkopolski managers
1938 FIFA World Cup players
Auschwitz concentration camp survivors
Sachsenhausen concentration camp survivors
Footballers from Kraków
Association football forwards
Polish football managers
Polish Austro-Hungarians
People from the Kingdom of Galicia and Lodomeria